Haji Danter is a village in Anantnag tehsil in Anantnag district in Jammu and Kashmir, India. It is adjacent to Anantnag town, just 1.5  kms away from lalchowk Anantnag and nearest village to District Headquarters. The approaches to the village are through Achabal Adda, Khanabal chowk and Naid khunoo Harnaag.  The village is surrounded by all the three main  tributaries of River Jhelum of Kashmir, The Brengi, The Aarpath, The Saandran. The village used to be main business hub in early times, because of developed water transport. The place has a port in its surroundings called Ghaat-e- Pushwara. The place had the first automatic hydral grinding machine called jindra, where people from far away places used to come to get their rice, wheat and spices ground.

The village has a population of around 3500 and has highest literacy rate among the areas surrounding it. The area being surrounded by rivers on all sides due to which it is  frequently hit by floods. The main religion of the people is Islam.

Demographics
Kashmiri is the local language of the area. People , however,  also speak Urdu and Hindi. The place has population of about 3500 and has literacy rate of more than 95%. The area shares boundaries with Khanabal, Harnag , etc.

See also
Doru shahabad
Khanabal
Chowgam
Awantipora
Kulgam District
Fatehpora

References

External links 
Articles about Anantnag in The Economic Times

Ancient Indian cities
Cities and towns in Anantnag district